Shep, or The Thanhouser Dog or Shep the Dog (died November 1914), was a male collie dog who starred in a number of silent films made by the Thanhouser Company.

Life
Shep was a collie owned by Jack Harvey, a film director.
When Harvey was working for Vitagraph Studios, Shep appeared in a number of films, but was not given much publicity.
In September 1914 Motion Picture Magazine said that Shep was owned by Arthur Ashley while he was with Vitagraph. In A Dog's Love, an 11 minute short released in October 1914, Shep plays a dog who grieves after his human playmate (Helen Badgley) has died. Other successful films in which Shep appeared were Shep's Race with Death and A Dog's Good Deed.

In November 1914 Reel Life said, "In The Barrier of Flames, a forthcoming Thanhouser release, Shep, the beautiful collie, who daily reports for work at the New Rochelle studio, performed another daring rescue, distinguishing himself by a feat of human heroism and sagacity by climbing a ladder and rescuing Helen Badgley from the top story of a burning house." The same month, The Moving Picture World wrote "Shep, Thanhouser's collie, has recently been acclaimed by critics as a great dog actor. His work in motion pictures is a study in itself. The dog rehearses his parts and goes through them just like a regular actor and never grumbles or tries to sass back."

In a feature on Shep, The Chicago News of 23 December 1914 said: 

Shep died after a short illness in November 1914. The New York Star reported the death, and said, "There was much sorrow expressed last week at the death of Shep, the Thanhouser dog, who had created a unique part for himself in moving picture work. For Shep was a dramatic actor and could register sorrow or joy with the ease of a great artist. He was known to thousands for his work upon the screen, and though he had many imitators few were even in his class."

Filmography

 With the Assistance of 'Shep''' (1913 short)
 Shep, the Hero (1913 short) as Shep
 Faithful Shep (1913 short) as Shep
 Their Mutual Friend (1913 short) as Dick
 Heartbroken Shep (1913 short) as Shep
 Good Pals (1914 short) as Shep
 Love's Old Dream (1914 short)
 Sonny Jim at the North Pole (1914 short) as Shep
 The Violin of M'sieur (1914 short) as Napoleon the dog
 The Million Dollar Mystery (1914 film serial)
 The Little Captain (1914 short) as Shep
 A Dog's Good Deed (1914 short) as Shep
 A Dog's Love (1914 short) as Shep
 Shep's Race with Death (1914 short) as Shep
 The Barrier of Flames (1914 short) as Shep
 Shep the Sentinel'' (1915 short) as Shep (posthumously released)

References

External links

1914 animal deaths
Dog actors
Thanhouser Company